Seebach is a river in Ismaning, Bavaria, Germany. It flows through Ismaning and enters the Isar from the right.

See also
List of rivers of Bavaria

References

Rivers of Bavaria
Rivers of Germany